Politics (1988) is the sixth studio album from the jazz group Yellowjackets. The album was awarded "Best Jazz Fusion Performance" at the 1989 Grammy Awards.

Track listing

Personnel 

Yellowjackets
 Russell Ferrante – keyboards
 Jimmy Haslip – 5-string bass
 Will Kennedy – drums
 Marc Russo – saxophones

Guest Musicians
 Steve Croes – Synclavier programming
 Alex Acuña – percussion

Production 

 Yellowjackets – producers
 David Hentschel – producer, recording, mixing
 Ricky Schultz – executive producer
 Bart Stevens – assistant engineer
 Sharon Rice – mix assistant 
 Stephen Marcussen – mastering
 Gary Borman – artist management
 Jeff Lancaster (L-Shape Ltd.) – art director
 Lou Beach – illustration
 Aaron Rapoport – photography

Studios
 Recorded at Schnee Studios (North Hollywood, CA).
 Mixed at The Complex (Los Angeles, CA).
 Mastered at Precision Lacquer, (Los Angeles, CA).

Awards
1988 - 31st Annual GRAMMY Awards

References

Yellowjackets albums
1988 albums
Albums produced by David Hentschel
MCA Records albums
Instrumental albums